Men's handball at the 2002 Asian Games was held in  	Changwon Gymnasium, Changwon from September 30 to October 13, 2002.

Squads

Results
All times are Korea Standard Time (UTC+09:00)

Preliminary

Group A

Group B

Classification 5th–8th

Classification 7th–8th

Classification 5th–6th

Final round

Semifinals

Final 3rd–4th

Final 1st–2nd

Final standing

References

Results
Results

External links
Official website

Men